Donna Allen (August 19, 1920 – July 19, 1999) was an American pioneer feminist, civil rights activist, historian, economist, and founder of the Women’s Institute for Freedom of the Press.

Biography
Allen was born in Petosky, Michigan on August 19, 1920 to Caspar and Louis Rehkopf. In 1943, Allen graduated from Duke University, majoring in history and minoring in economics. In 1953, she earned her master's degree in economics from the University of Chicago. Finally, in 1971, she received a Ph.D. in history from Howard University. Her dissertation was on national health insurance. Allen founded the Women’s Institute for Freedom of the Press in 1972. Allen died at age 78 on July 19, 1999.

The Donna Allen Award for Feminist Advocacy
The Donna Allen Award for Feminist Advocacy is given in Allen's honor by the Commission on the Status of Women for the Association for Education in Journalism and Mass Communication (AEJMC). The award was created in 2001. It recognizes feminist media activists who promote women’s rights and freedoms. Some recipients of this award are:
2001 – Award Created
2002 – no winner on record
2003 – Ammu Joseph, Women’s Feature Service
2004 – Rita Henley Jenson, Women’s eNews
2005 – Michelle Weldon, Northwestern
2006 – no winner on record
2007 – no winner on record
2008 – Caryl Rivers, Boston
2009 – Carolyn Byerly, Howard
2010 – Pamela Creedon, Iowa
2011- ?
2012 - ?
2013 – Soraya Chemaly
2014 - Barbara Friedman and Anne Johnston 
2015 – Tania Cantrell Rosas-Moreno
2016 – Stine Eckert
2017 – Carolyn Bronstein
2018 – Petula Dvorak
2019 – Tracy Everbach
2020 – Susan Leath
2021 – Maria Marron

Writings

Books
 Women Transforming Communications: Global Intersections; (Edited with Ramona R. Rush, Susan J. Kaufman, eds.) (SAGE Publications, 1996).
 Communications at the Crossroads: The Gender Gap Connection; (Edited with Ramona R. Rush) (Ablex Publishing Corporation, 1989). 
 Fringe Benefits: Wages or Social Obligations?; (Ithaca, NY: Cornell University, 1964).

Periodicals
 Media Report to Women; (1972–1987) : Editor.

Awards

References 

1920 births
1999 deaths
American founders
American feminists
20th-century American economists
American editors
American women editors
American women economists
American women non-fiction writers
20th-century American women
Duke University alumni
University of Chicago alumni
Howard University alumni